Arthur Charles may refer to:

 Sir Arthur Charles (judge) (1839–1921), English High Court judge
 Sir Arthur Eber Sydney Charles (1910–1965), Speaker of the Legislative Council of Aden, see Assassination of Sir Arthur Charles
 Arthur H. Charles (1911–1999), American politician from Maine